Diah Permatasari (born 25 January 1971) is an Indonesian actress and model. She became popular with the public after starring in the film Si Manis Jembatan Ancol.

Career
She began her career as a model, and was a finalist in Wajah Femina in 1989. She has starred in films such as Barang Titipan, Salah Pencet, Bebas Aturan Main, Si Manis Jembatan Ancol, Saya Duluan Dong, and Malam Suro di Rumah Darmo. In 2014, she played Cenayang in the horror film Malam Suro di Rumah Darmo. On television, she has appeared in soap operas such as Bidadari, Panji Manusia , Mutiara Cinta, Dewi Fortuna, Iman, Taubat, Upik Abu dan Laura, Seruni, Arti Sahabat, Anugerah, Binar Bening Berlian, Saudara Oesman, Karunia, Akibat Pernikahan Dini, and others.

Personal life
She married Anton Wahyu Jatmiko on 5 April 1997. They have two sons.

Filmography

Film

Television
 Mutiara Cinta
 Si Manis Jembatan Ancol
 Panji Manusia 
 Keluarga Cemara
 Bidadari
 Indra Keenam
 Mody Juragan Kost
 Wiro Sableng
 Hati yang Terpilih
 Dewi Fortuna
 Buah Hati Yang Hilang
 KehendakMu Spc. Anissa
 Warkop episode Cewek OK Cowok OK
 Lola dan Liliput
 Pura-Pura Buta
 Iman
 Taubat
 Upik Abu dan Laura
 Seruni
 Arti Sahabat
 Anugerah
 Binar Bening Berlian
 Saudara Oesman
 Karunia
 Akibat Pernikahan Dini
 Warkop Millennium
 Ganteng Ganteng Serigala Returns
 Ada Si Manis di Jembatan

Film Television
 Sang Petinju
 Terjebak

External links
  Profil Diah Permatasari di situs web Galleri Artis
  Berita Diah Permatasari di situs web Disc Tarra
  beritanya di Gatra
  Berita Diah Permatasari di situs web Detik Hot

References

1971 births
Indonesian female models
Indonesian actresses
Indonesian Muslims
Javanese people
Living people
George Mason University alumni
People from Surakarta